Prince Leopold was launched in 1816 in Sunderland. She traded primarily between London and the Mediterranean, but was wrecked on 2 October 1825 on a voyage to Montevideo.

Career
Prince Leopold first appeared in Lloyd's Register (LR) in 1816. She spent most of her career sailing between England and the Mediterranean though there are records of the occasional voyage to the West Indies.

Fate
On 2 October 1825 a gale drove Prince Leopold on the Pipas Rocks, in the River Plate, about five miles west of the Island of Flores. Her crew abandoned her the next day, taking a boat; they arrived at Montevideo the same afternoon. A report dated 13 October stated that her cargo would be saved, but that it was so damaged that it would be sold for the account of the insurers. On 11 November Liberty arrived with much of Prince Leopolds cargo; Prince Leopold herself was sold for $180.

Citations

1816 ships
Ships built in England
Age of Sail merchant ships of England
Maritime incidents in October 1825